Swara Bhasker (also spelled Bhaskar; born 9 April 1988) is an Indian actress who works in Hindi films. Best known for her supporting work in mainstream productions and starring roles in independent films, she has won two Screen Awards and has been nominated for a Filmfare Award on three occasions.

Swara made her film debut with a supporting role in the 2009 drama Madholal Keep Walking, a commercial failure. She got wider recognition for her supporting role in the commercially 2011 successful romantic comedy Tanu Weds Manu. Her performance in the film was well received by critics and she garnered a Filmfare Award for Best Supporting Actress nomination.

Swara garnered further praise for her performance in the critically acclaimed romantic drama Raanjhanaa (2013), the role earned her second Filmfare Award for Best Supporting Actress nomination. She then reprised her role from Tanu Weds Manu in the film's sequel and later appeared in the family drama Prem Ratan Dhan Payo; both productions were among the highest-grossing Bollywood films of 2015. Her starring roles in the independent films Nil Battey Sannata (2016), and Anaarkali of Aarah (2017) earned her further acclaim.
She won the Screen Award for Best Actress (Critics) for the former and was nominated for the Filmfare Award for Best Actress (Critics) for the latter.

Early life and education 
Swara Bhasker was born on 9 April 1988 in Delhi to C. Uday Bhaskar, an Indian Navy officer of Telugu descent, and his wife Ira Bhaskar, a professor of cinema studies in Jawaharlal Nehru University, Delhi who is of Bihari origin. Her maternal grandmother was from Varanasi.

Bhasker grew up in Delhi, where she did her schooling from Sardar Patel Vidyalaya. She subsequently studied English  literature at Delhi University's Miranda House where she was classmates with another actress, Minissha Lamba. She did her master's degree in sociology from Jawaharlal Nehru University, Delhi.

Acting career

2009–2012: Debut and further roles 
Before Bhasker started acting in films she was associated with N. K. Sharma's "Act One" theater group in Delhi. She shifted to Mumbai in 2008 and made her acting debut with the 2009 film Madholal Keep Walking, which was screened at the 33rd Cairo International Film Festival but underperformed at the box office India. She then played a supporting role in Sanjay Leela Bhansali's drama Guzaarish (2010), alongside Hritik Roshan and Aishwariya Rai.

However, both Guzaarish and The Untitled Kartik Krishnan Project were box-office failures and Bhasker remained unnoticed for her performances.

Bhasker garnered widespread recognition from the audiences and critics by appearing in the 2011's commercially successful film Tanu Weds Manu in which she played the role of Payal, the best friend of the lead actress Kangana Ranaut. She received praise and several nominations, including the Best Supporting Actress conferred by the Filmfare Awards.

2013–present: Critical and commercial success 

In 2013, she played the lead role in Listen... Amaya (2013), which also saw the reunion of actors Farooq Sheikh and Deepti Naval after 28 years, and earned positive reviews from critics. She then appeared in Raanjhanaa, along with Dhanush and Sonam Kapoor, which was one of the highest-grossing Bollywood film of the year. She received wide critical praise as well as her second Filmfare Award for Best Supporting Actress nomination for her role of Bindiya in the film. She appeared in a lead female role in the box-office flop Sabki Bajegi Band opposite Sumeet Vyas and in the moderate successful Machhli Jal Ki Rani Hai with Bhanu Uday.

Bhasker served as a host for Shyam Benegal's television mini-series Samvidhaan, which was based on the making of the Indian Constitution. The series aired on Rajya Sabha TV from March 2014 to May 2014. On her trip to Lahore, Pakistan, Bhasker appeared as a guest in the Pakistani TV comedy show, Mazaaq Raat which was aired in April 2015.

Bhasker had three releases in 2015. In her first release, she reprised her role of Payal in the romantic comedy Tanu Weds Manu Returns, a sequel to the 2011 film Tanu Weds Manu. The film and Bhasker's performance received wide critical acclaim. The film was a financial success as well and became one of the few women-centric films that rank among the highest-grossing Indian films. Her next release was the romantic drama Prem Ratan Dhan Payo, in which she played the role of Rajkumari Chandrika alongside Salman Khan and Sonam Kapoor. Directed by Sooraj Barjatya, the film received mixed reviews. However, Bhasker's performance was well received by the critics and audience. That same year, she played a minor role in the collaborative bilingual X: Past Is Present. The film was directed by eleven filmmakers, and Bhasker appeared in Nalan Kumarasamy's segment, Summer Holiday, which revolves around a young boy (played by Anshuman Jha), who goes to South India for summer holidays where an Aunty seduced him so that her husband can rape him. Although the film received mixed reviews, but her role of Aunty was particularly praised. Namrata Joshi of The Hindu wrote "X: Past Is Present belongs to its women".

In 2016, Bhasker played the lead in Anand L. Rai's comedy drama Nil Battey Sannata which marked her fourth collaboration with Rai. Bhasker was initially skeptical about the film because of the age difference between her and her character. However, she changed her mind after reading the script and played the role of a mother of a teenager. Upon the release, the film as well as Bhasker's performance received critical acclaim and she was awarded with the Best Actress trophy at the Silk Road International Film Festival in September 2015. She began working in web series with It's Not That Simple, which is produced by Viacom 18's streaming service Voot. The show revolves around the idea of marriage, relationships, a woman's stand in a marriage, love etc. The series stars Bhasker along with television stars Vivan Bhatena, Akshay Oberoi and Karanveer Mehra, with Danish Aslam as the director.

, Bhasker had completed shooting for Abbas Tyrewala's comedy drama Mango, starring Chandan Roy Sanyal and Monali Thakur, being produced under the banner of Kaleidoscope Entertainment. The film has been indefinitely delayed. She also played the lead role in Shashanka Ghosh's 2018 romantic comedy film Veere Di Wedding, co-starring Kareena Kapoor, Sonam Kapoor and Shikha Talsania, about four girls who embark on a trip from Delhi to Europe. Her masturbation scene using a vibrator in the film was praised for its frank portrayal of women's sexuality.

Personal life
Bhasker has been a vocal critic of the Citizenship (Amendment) Act. She has participated in the Citizenship Amendment Act protests. In February 2023, she married activist Fahad Ahmad.

Filmography

Films

Television

Accolades

References

External links 

 
 
 

1988 births
Living people
Indian film actresses
Actresses in Hindi cinema
Actresses from Delhi
Delhi University alumni
Jawaharlal Nehru University alumni
Indian stage actresses
21st-century Indian actresses
Zee Cine Awards winners
Screen Awards winners
People involved in the Citizenship Amendment Act protests
Age controversies